Night Pastor is a short horror film directed by Alex Chandon and stars Neil Keenan and Matt Russel.

Plot
The Night Pastor, a Jesus blending, prevails in the city by force of law and order! The long-haired priest, with God's blessing and lead-based arguments going against the prevailing sins of his city. The meet while the sinner to heaven faster than they can "say" Amen, the pastor should preach to empty crowds.

Cast
 Alex Chandon
 Neil Keenan
 Matt Russel

Release
The movie is part of the SOI Film Entertainment DVD, which was released with Chainsaw Scumfuck, Drillbit and Bad Karma on one Disc.

References

External links

1998 films
1998 horror films
British horror short films
British independent films
Films directed by Alex Chandon
1990s English-language films
1990s British films